Buddy's Buddy: Buddy Holly Songs by Jimmy Gilmer is an album by singer Jimmy Gilmer, released in 1964. The album is a tribute to Buddy Holly who died in a 1959 plane crash along with Ritchie Valens and The Big Bopper.

Track listing

Side one
"Look at Me"
"Wishing"
"I'm Gonna Love You Too"
"Think It Over"
"Lonesome Tears"
"Maybe Baby"

Side two
"Listen to Me"
"Everyday"
"Words of Love"
"It's So Easy!"
"Little Baby"
"Oh, Boy!"

1964 albums
Jimmy Gilmer albums
Dot Records albums
Albums produced by Norman Petty
Buddy Holly tribute albums